Conus geographus, popularly called the geography cone or the geographer cone, is a species of predatory cone snail. It lives in reefs of the tropical Indo-Pacific, and hunts small fish. While all cone snails hunt and kill prey using venom, the venom of conus geographus is potent enough to kill humans. 

The variety Conus geographus var. rosea G. B. Sowerby I, 1833 is a synonym of Conus eldredi Morrison, 1955.

This species is the type species of :
 Gastridium Modeer, 1793
 Rollus Montfort, 1810
 Utriculus Schumacher, 1817

Shell description
C. geographus has a broad, thin shell, cylindrically inflated. The ground color of the shell is pink or violaceous white, occasionally reddish. It has a mottled appearance, clouded and coarsely reticulated with chestnut or chocolate, usually forming two very irregular bands. This intricate brown-and-white pattern is highly prized by shell collectors.

The geography cone has a wide, violaceous white or pink aperture and numerous shoulder ridges or spines. The shell is covered with thread-like revolving striae, usually nearly obsolete except at the base. The flattened spire is striated and coronated.

In comparison with other species, the shell has a noticeably wider and convex mid-body, with a flattened spire. Its walls are also noticeably thinner and lighter compared to other cone shells of similar length and size.

Distribution
Geography cones are common.  They occur in the Red Sea, in the Indian Ocean off Chagos, Réunion, Madagascar, Mauritius, Mozambique and Tanzania. They are indigenous to the reefs of the Indo-Pacific region, except for Hawaii, and off Australia (the Northern Territory, Queensland, Western Australia).

Ecology 
C. geographus is a piscivore that dwells in sediment of shallow reefs, preying on small fish. Like the other cone snails, it fires a harpoon-like, venom-tipped modified tooth into its prey; the harpoon is attached to the body by a proboscis, and the prey is pulled inside for ingestion.

Venom 

The geography cone snail is highly dangerous; live specimens should be handled with extreme caution. C. geographus has the most toxic sting known among Conus species and there are reports for about three dozen human fatalities in 300 years. 
The venom has an LD50 toxicity in of 0.012-0.030 mg/kg. The venom of the geography cone snail is a complex mix of hundreds of different toxins that is delivered through toxoglossan radula, a harpoon-like tooth propelled from an extendable proboscis. There is no antivenom for a cone snail sting, and treatment consists of keeping victims alive until the toxins wear off.  The geography cone is also known colloquially as the "cigarette snail", a gallows humor exaggeration implying that, when stung by this creature, the victim will have only enough time to smoke a cigarette before dying. In reality, even the most venomous cone snails take about one to five hours to kill a healthy human, though medical care must still be prompt as, without it, death is almost certain. 
 
Among the compounds found in cone snail venom are proteins which, when isolated, have great potential as pain-killing drugs. Research shows that certain component proteins of the venom target specific human pain receptors and can be up to 10,000 times more potent than morphine without morphine's addictive properties and side-effects.  Conantokin-G is a toxin derived from the venom of C. geographus. Only 15-20 of the venom's 100-200 toxic peptides are used for feeding. It is believed that the other compounds are defensive, and that the venom is mainly used for defense.

Insulin
Recent research has revealed that C. geographus uses a form of insulin as a means of stunning its prey. This insulin is distinct from its own (with shorter chains) and appears to be a stripped down version of those insulins found in fish. Once this venom passes through a fish's gills, the fish experiences hypoglycaemic shock, essentially stunning it and allowing for ingestion by the snail. This poison mixture has been referred to as nirvana cabal.  Along with the tulip cone snail C. tulipa, no other species of any known lifeform is known to have used its own biological insulin as a weapon.

References 
This article incorporates CC-BY-3.0 text from the reference.

Further reading 

  Linnaeus, C. (1758). Systema Naturae per regna tria naturae, secundum classes, ordines, genera, species, cum characteribus, differentiis, synonymis, locis. Editio decima, reformata. Laurentius Salvius: Holmiae. ii, 824 pp 
 Dufo, M.H. 1840. Observations sur les Mollusques marins, terrestres et fluviatiles des iles Séchelles et des Amirantes. Annales des Sciences Naturelles, Paris 2 14, Zoologie: 45-80 (extrait), 166-221(suite)
 Reeve, L.A. 1843. Monograph of the genus Conus. pls 1-39 in Reeve, L.A. (ed.). Conchologica Iconica. London : L. Reeve & Co. Vol. 1.
 Hedley, C. 1899. The Mollusca of Funafuti. Part 1. Gastropoda. Memoirs of the Australian Museum 3(7): 395-488, 49 text figs
 Schepman, M.M. 1913. Toxoglossa. 384-396 in Weber, M. & de Beaufort, L.F. (eds). The Prosobranchia, Pulmonata and Opisthobranchia Tectibranchiata, Tribe Bullomorpha, of the Siboga Expedition. Monograph 49. Siboga Expeditie 32(2)
 Allan, J.K. 1950. Australian Shells: with related animals living in the sea, in freshwater and on the land. Melbourne : Georgian House xix, 470 pp., 45 pls, 112 text figs.
 Satyamurti, S.T. 1952. Mollusca of Krusadai Is. I. Amphineura and Gastropoda. Bulletin of the Madras Government Museum, Natural History ns 1(no. 2, pt 6): 267 pp., 34 pls 
 Gillett, K. & McNeill, F. 1959. The Great Barrier Reef and Adjacent Isles: a comprehensive survey for visitor, naturalist and photographer. Sydney : Coral Press 209 pp.
 McMichael, D.F. 1960. Shells of the Australian Sea-Shore. Brisbane : Jacaranda Press 127 pp., 287 figs.
 Rippingale, O.H. & McMichael, D.F. 1961. Queensland and Great Barrier Reef Shells. Brisbane : Jacaranda Press 210 pp.
 Wilson, B.R. & Gillett, K. 1971. Australian Shells: illustrating and describing 600 species of marine gastropods found in Australian waters. Sydney : Reed Books 168 pp.
 Hinton, A. 1972. Shells of New Guinea and the Central Indo-Pacific. Milton : Jacaranda Press xviii 94 pp. 
 Salvat, B. & Rives, C. 1975. Coquillages de Polynésie. Tahiti : Papéete Les editions du pacifique, pp. 1–391.
 Cernohorsky, W.O. 1978. Tropical Pacific Marine Shells. Sydney : Pacific Publications 352 pp., 68 pls. 
 Wilson, B. 1994. Australian Marine Shells. Prosobranch Gastropods. Kallaroo, WA : Odyssey Publishing Vol. 2 370 pp. 
 Röckel, D., Korn, W. & Kohn, A.J. 1995. Manual of the Living Conidae. Volume 1: Indo-Pacific Region. Wiesbaden : Hemmen 517 pp.
 Filmer R.M. (2001). A Catalogue of Nomenclature and Taxonomy in the Living Conidae 1758 - 1998. Backhuys Publishers, Leiden. 388pp
 Tucker J.K. (2009). Recent cone species database. September 4, 2009 Edition
 Tucker J.K. & Tenorio M.J. (2009) Systematic classification of Recent and fossil conoidean gastropods. Hackenheim: Conchbooks. 296 pp
 Puillandre N., Duda T.F., Meyer C., Olivera B.M. & Bouchet P. (2015). One, four or 100 genera? A new classification of the cone snails. Journal of Molluscan Studies. 81: 1-23

Gallery

External links

 Conus geographus, part of the Encyclopædia Romana by James Grout.
 
 Cone Shells - Knights of the Sea
 

geographus
Gastropods described in 1758
Taxa named by Carl Linnaeus